Born Yesterday may refer to:

 Born Yesterday (play), a 1946 Broadway play by Garson Kanin
 Born Yesterday (1950 film), a 1950 film directed by George Cukor
 Born Yesterday (1956 film), a 1956 TV film directed by Garson Kanin
 Born Yesterday (1993 film), a 1993 film directed by Luis Mandoki
 Born Yesterday (album), a 1985 album by The Everly Brothers
Born Yesterday (song), a 2022 song by Quadeca

See also
 I Wasn't Born Yesterday, a 1991 album by singer Sa-Fire